The state of Texas has had many hurricanes affect it. It is the US state with the second-most hurricanes affecting it, only behind Florida. Storms affecting it go back to 1527.

Pre-1900

1900–1949

1950–1979

1980–present

See also
 List of United States hurricanes

References

Texas
Hurricanes